Severny Island ice cap is an ice cap on Severny Island, northern island of the Novaya Zemlya archipelago in Russia.

Glaciers
A number of glaciers flow from the inner ice cap to Severny Island's coastline. Mount Kruzenshtern, the highest point of Novaya Zemlya, rises on the western edge of the Severny Island ice cap, near the head of the Glazov Glacier.

West coast
The following glaciers have their terminus on the coast of the Barents Sea.

 Anna Glacier
 Anuchin Glacier
 Arkhangel Bay Glacier
 Brounov Glacier
 Borzov Glacier
 Bull Glacier
 Bunge Glacier
 Chayev Glacier
 Chernishev Glacier
 Glazov Glacier
 Inostrantsev Glacier
 Karbasnikov Glacier
 Krayniy Glacier
 Lakrua Glacier
 Mack Glacier
 Nizkiy Glacier
 Pavlov Glacier
 Petersen Glacier
 Popov Glacier
 Rikachev Glacier
 Severnyy Glacier
 Shirokiy Glacier
 Shokalsky Glacier
 Taisiya Glacier
 Velken Glacier
 Vera Glacier
 Vize Glacier
 Voyekov Glacier
 Yuzhnyy Glacier

East coast
The following glaciers have their terminus on the coast of the Kara Sea.

 Goluboy Glacier
 Kropotkin Glacier
 Moschnyy Glacier
 Nansen Glacier
 Polisadov Glacier
 Serp i Molot Glacier
 Vitte Glacier
 Nordenskiöld Glacier, group of four glaciers:
 Vershinsky Glacier
 Novopashenny Glacier, also known as 
 Rozhdestvensky Glacier
 Roze Glacier

Other glaciers
Lednikovoye Glaciers with their terminus in Lednikovoye Lake

Nunataks
Gora Severny Nunatak is a nunatak located in the northern section of the long ice cap not far from the western coast of the island. Further to the northeast there is another nunatak between the two outlets of the Bunge Glacier.

See also
 List of glaciers in Europe
 List of glaciers in Russia
 List of fjords of Russia

References

Novaya Zemlya
Ice caps of Russia
Bodies of water of Arkhangelsk Oblast